Nogaysky District (Nogay: , Nogay rayonı; ; , Noğay rayon) is an administrative and a municipal district (raion), one of the ten in the Karachay-Cherkess Republic, Russia. It is located in the north of the republic. Its administrative center is the rural locality (a settlement) of Erken-Shakhar. As of the 2010 Census, the total population of the district was 15,659, with the population of Erken-Shakhar accounting for 26.7% of that number.

History
The district was established in 2007.

Administrative and municipal status
Within the framework of administrative divisions, Nogaysky District is one of the ten in the Karachay-Cherkess Republic and has administrative jurisdiction over all of its eight rural localities. As a municipal division, the district is incorporated as Nogaysky Municipal District. Its eight rural localities are incorporated into five rural settlements within the municipal district. The settlement of Erken-Shakhar serves as the administrative center of both the administrative and municipal district.

References

Notes

Sources

Districts of Karachay-Cherkessia